Paranthe Wali Gali is a 2014 Indian romance comedy film directed and produced by the award-winning playwright and theatre director Sachin Gupta under Chilsag-Civitech Motion Pictures. It is produced by Sachin Gupta and Sushma Gupta and co-produced by Subodh Goel and Alka Goel. The film stars Anuj Saxena and Neha Pawar in the lead roles.

Cast
 Anuj Saxena as Maulik
 Neha Pawar as Naina Kaur
 Mohinder Gujral as Rimjhim Gaur
 Vijayant Kohli as Saluja
 Himanshu Thakkar as Danish
 Yuvraj Haral as Vivian
 Prabhakar Srinet as Farhaz
 Paropkar Singh as Jasmeet
 Jaspreet Kaur as Surili
 Ritika Jasmera as Tamanna

Music

The music for the film was composed by Vasundhara Das and Vikram Khajuria and the background score by Vikram Khajuria with song lyrics by Vipin Mishra, Viraj Mishra and Devshi khanduri. The soundtrack album was released on 30 December 2013, with the following songs.

Track listing

References

External links
 
 Official website
 Facebook
 Twitter
 Instagram ParantheWaliGaliTheFilm

2010s Hindi-language films
Indian romantic comedy films
2014 films
Films set in Delhi
2014 romantic comedy films
Reliance Entertainment films